Toshloq District is a district of Fergana Region in Uzbekistan. The capital lies at the town Toshloq. The district consists of 10 urban-type settlements (Toshloq, Arabmozor, Axshak, Varzak, Zarkent, Qumariq, Quyi Nayman, Sadda, Turvat, Yakkatut) and 10 rural communities.

References

Districts of Uzbekistan
Fergana Region